Fries may refer to:

Food
 French fries, strips of deep-fried potato commonly referred to as "fries" in the USA
 Home fries, diced or sliced fried potatoes
 Lamb fries, lamb testicles eaten as food

People
 Fries Deschilder (born 1992), Belgian footballer
 Fries (surname), including a list of people with the name

Other uses
 Fries, Virginia
 Fries, a form of the verb "to fry": see frying
 Fast Rope Insertion Extraction System, or fast-roping, a technique for descending a thick rope
 Fries rearrangement, a chemical reaction
 Frisian languages, languages spoken in Friesland (Netherlands) and East Friesland (Germany)

See also
Fry (disambiguation)
 
 Fray (disambiguation)
 Frey (disambiguation)
 Fried (disambiguation)
 Frye
 Small Fry (disambiguation)